Nainital Gewog is a former a gewog (village block) of Samtse District, Bhutan. Nainital Gewog was part of Chengmari Dungkhag, together with Chargharey, Ghumauney, and Chengmari Gewogs.

References

Former gewogs of Bhutan
Samtse District